Joseph or Joe Grace may refer to:

 Joseph Patrick Grace (born 1949), American film producer
 Joseph Peter Grace Sr. (1872–1950), American businessman
 J. Peter Grace (1913–1995), American businessman
 Joe Grace (baseball) (1914–1969), baseball outfielder
 Joe Grace (Australian footballer) (1878–1919), Australian rules footballer
 Joe Grace (Irish footballer) (died 1959), Ireland international footballer